Robert Wayne Detherage (born September 20, 1954) is a former Major League Baseball player. Detherage played for Kansas City Royals in the 1980 season. In twenty career games, he had eight hits in 26 at-bats with seven RBIs. He played the Outfield in all of his games.

Detherage was drafted originally by the Los Angeles Dodgers in 1972.

External links

Kansas City Royals players
1954 births
Baseball players from Missouri
Living people
Ogden Dodgers players
Daytona Beach Dodgers players
Bakersfield Dodgers players
Waterbury Dodgers players
Arkansas Travelers players
Tulsa Oilers (baseball) players
Columbus Astros players
Charleston Charlies players
Omaha Royals players